Balne is a village and civil parish in the Selby District of North Yorkshire in England, south of Selby.  According to the 2001 census the parish had a population of 231, reducing to 224 at the 2011 census.  The parish is bound to the north-east by the East Riding of Yorkshire and to the south by the Metropolitan Borough of Doncaster in South Yorkshire.

Balne was historically in the West Riding of Yorkshire until 1974.

The village formed the centre of the ancient district of Balne, which consisted of the eastern part of the Osgoldcross wapentake, probably including all the land between the River Don and the River Aire.  Places such as Walden Stubbs and Fishlake were formerly described as being "-in-Balne", and Thorpe-in-Balne still is. Balne Croft Common near Thorne may have been a detached part of the township of Balne.

The village has a Grade II Listed Building called Lowgate Farmhouse. Until 1958, Balne had a railway station as part of the North Eastern Railway.

References

External links

Ancient subdivisions of Yorkshire
Civil parishes in North Yorkshire
Selby District
Villages in North Yorkshire